Resolution is the second studio album by American hip hop group The Perceptionists. It was released on Mello Music Group on July 28, 2017. Music videos were created for "Hose Down" and "Free at Last".

Background
Shortly after the release of The Perceptionists' debut studio album, Black Dialogue, on Definitive Jux in 2005, DJ Fakts One left the group. The group's remaining members, Mr. Lif and Akrobatik, subsequently released solo material and collaborative material with other artists. In 2017, the two got signed to Mello Music Group and returned with a studio album, titled Resolution.

Critical reception

Paul Simpson of AllMusic gave the album 3.5 out of 5 stars, stating: "Like the first Perceptionists album, Resolution maintains a heavy focus on socially conscious lyrics, calling out injustice and lamenting the disappointing state of the world." Scott Glaysher of HipHopDX gave the album a 3.4 out of 5, commenting that "Lif and Ak tackle a plethora of topics on the 11-track LP, including police, politics and big Pharma" and "the album has the tendency to come across as a conspiracy theorist's guide to 2017."

Track listing

References

External links
 

2017 albums
Mello Music Group albums
Mr. Lif albums
Akrobatik albums